Gughe or Guge is a mountain located near the city of Arba Minch, and the Abaya Lake, in Ethiopia.

References

Mountains of Ethiopia